Peter Mark O'Reilly (born 23 July 1964) is a former Irish sports journalist for The Sunday Times, and a former first-class cricketer.

Born at Dublin, O'Reilly was educated in the city at Belvedere College. Aged 18, he made his debut in first-class cricket for Ireland against Scotland at Edinburgh in 1982. He spent 1983 and 1984 in England playing for Warwickshire Second XI, but was unable to force his way into the first eleven. He made a second first-class appearance for Ireland in 1984 against Scotland at Glasgow. A fast bowler, O'Reilly took 5 wickets across his two first-class matches, at an average of 16.20, with best figures of 3/43.

After two seasons in England, O'Reilly returned to Ireland to study art and history at University College Dublin. After graduating, he taught history at St. Andrew's College, Dublin. He briefly returned to the Irish side in 1990, playing minor matches against the touring New Zealanders, as well as touring Zimbabwe. Following the death of The Irish Times cricket correspondent Sean Pender, O'Reilly left his teaching job to fill the vacant cricket correspondent job at the newspaper. He became their rugby correspondent in 1995, a position he also held at various times with the Sunday Tribune and the Irish Independent. He is the current Irish rugby correspondent for The Sunday Times. O'Reilly has written books on Irish rugby, including the acclaimed Ireland and the Triple Crown, The Full Bag of Chips, released in 2004. His daughter, Lucy O'Reilly, plays for the Irish women's cricket team.

References

External links

1964 births
Living people
Cricketers from Dublin (city)
People educated at Belvedere College
Alumni of University College Dublin
Irish cricketers
Irish educators
Irish sports journalists
Irish sportswriters
Irish male non-fiction writers
The Irish Times people
Sunday Tribune people
Irish Independent people
The Sunday Times people